Mindigulovo (Mändäğol) is a rural locality (a village) in Kiyekbayevsky Selsoviet, Burzyansky District, Bashkortostan, Russia. The population was 85 as of 2010. There are 3 streets.

Geography 
Mindigulovo is located 11 km southwest of Starosubkhangulovo (the district's administrative centre) by road. Kiyekbayevo is the nearest rural locality.

References 

Rural localities in Burzyansky District